Absolute Boyfriend ("Absolute darling", titled My Perfect Darling in English in Japan) is a Taiwanese romance drama television series based on the manga by Yuu Watase. Jiro Wang, member of Taiwanese boy band Fahrenheit played Night Tenjo's role while South Korean actress Koo Hye-sun played Riiko Izawa.

Plot
Guan Xiaofei, an ordinary office worker, is disheartened when she once again gets rejected by a man she loves, Shi Lun. While walking through a park, Xiaofei picks up a cellphone dropped by an eccentric salesman, Lei Wuwu. In return for retrieving the phone, Wuwu gives Xiaofei a website address dedicated to the "Absolute Darling" project. Still skeptical, Xiaofei decides to fill up her order anyway and requests her own "darling", codenamed "Nightly 01" with hundreds of wish fulfillments. Xiaofei is surprised when Kronos Heaven, the company that Wuwu works for, delivers Nightly 01 the next day, and is even more flabbergasted when Nightly 01 turns out be a hyper-realistic, human-like male sex robot whose power activation requires a kiss. Despite his function as a sex robot, however, Xiaofei refuses the offer for sex and instead wants the robot, whom she names "Wan Naite", to be her boyfriend.

However, Xiaofei is informed that after three days of trial period that she has to buy the robot for NT$100,000,000. An attempt to search for work at a club is fruitless when Naite reacts violently to seeing Xiaofei being harassed, so instead Naite applies for a job at Xiaofei's office. His unusual attachment to Xiaofei becomes a sensation at the office and attracts the attention of Xiaofei's friend, Luo Meijia, who is revealed to be the one stopping Xiaofei from having a boyfriend due to an old incident at work where Xiaofei humiliated Meijia at the workplace. At a company retreat, Meijia tries to sabotage Xiaofei and attracts Naite's attention, but her plans are unsuccessful and she herself later quits the office in humiliation when everyone discovers her true nature. At the same time, Naite also incites jealousy on the part of Yan Zongshi, a childhood friend of Xiaofei who has long been in love with her.

Wuwu later tells Xiaofei that she does not need to pay for the original price, but instead she merely has to pay for Naite's service costs as well as recording all emotions to be displayed in Naite's emotion ring: calm (white), happy (red), pleasure (pink), upset (blue), sad (black), and an increased libido (yellow). To earn more money, Naite works at a club servicing female customers, though this only makes Xiaofei jealous. One of Naite's customers is Meijia, who kisses him, causing his allegiance to switch to her due to his simple programming. Despite this, though, the fact that he still remembers Xiaofei makes Wuwu realize that there is still hope for him to return to Xiaofei, who then goes through a swimming challenge to finally be able to kiss Naite back, a task that she is successful with.

Agitated with the hard road for libido, Wuwu arranges for Xiaofei and Naite to have a honeymoon at a private island, to no avail due to Zongshi's appearance. Kronos Heaven's leader, Jiang Baiqi, also sends another model, Nightly 02 under the name of his brother and Xiaofei's childhood friend, Jiang Junshu, to steal Naite's place in Xiaofei's heart, which ends in Naite's Pyrrhic victory, resulting in him having to be sent to Kronos Heaven to be scrapped. Nevertheless, Naite works his way to Xiaofei and defeats a doppelganger sent in his place for Xiaofei. Realizing that he has grown beyond his programming, Baiqi decides to let him go.

However, it is revealed that due to developing his own will, Naite is slowly dying from battery failure. Despite this, he does not tell Xiaofei and continues to make her happy in the days before his "death", all the while asking Zongshi to take care of Xiaofei once he is not around. In the final episode, Xiaofei and Naite arranges for a wedding. However, Naite and Xiaofei hold a dress rehearsal with just the two of them the night before the planned wedding, during which Naite finally shuts down, much to Xiaofei's grief. On the day of the funeral, Wuwu and Zongshi go to the church to find Naite already packaged to return to Kronos Heaven to be preserved by Baiqi until technology can improve to possibly revive him once more. Upon finding out Naite has 10 seconds left of charge, Xiaofei shares some last words with him in hopes he can still hear her.

Cast

Note: Characters' names displayed as "in-drama Taiwanese name / original Japanese name"

Production
It was announced at a press conference on October 5, 2010, that a live-action adaptation of Absolute Boyfriend will be filmed, starring singer-actor Wu Chun as "Night" and South Korean actress Ku Hye-sun as "Riiko". On May 3, 2011, Jiro Wang replaced fellow Fahrenheit band member Wu Chun as the male lead of the drama series. The series premiered on April 1, 2012, on FTV.

Broadcast

This is the first overseas drama to air in Singapore first before its premiere in Taiwan, although the Singapore broadcast didn't include bloopers/behind the scenes.

Reception

Source：China Times

Ratings (Philippines)

References

External links
 GTV official homepage 
 FTV official homepage 

Gala Television original programming
Formosa Television original programming
2012 Taiwanese television series debuts
2012 Taiwanese television series endings
Absolute Boyfriend